Ouled Sidi Brahim district is an Algerian administrative district in the M'Sila province.  Its capital is town of Sidi Aïssa.

Communes 
The district is composed of three communes.
Sidi Aïssa
Bouti Sayah
Beni Ilmane

References 

Districts of Tizi Ouzou Province
Districts of Djelfa Province